Shlomi Mrad (born 24 August 1989) is an Israeli footballer who plays for Tzeirei Tayibe in Liga Alef.

External links

1989 births
Living people
Israeli footballers
Hapoel Kfar Saba F.C. players
Ironi Tiberias F.C. players
Maccabi Kafr Kanna F.C. players
Hapoel Asi Gilboa F.C. players
Hapoel Nir Ramat HaSharon F.C. players
Hapoel Beit She'an F.C. players
Hapoel Iksal F.C. players
Ironi Nesher F.C. players
Hapoel Shefa-'Amr F.C. players
F.C. Haifa Robi Shapira players
Tzeirei Tayibe F.C. players
Liga Leumit players
Israeli Premier League players
Footballers from Tiberias
Association football midfielders